Dave's Garden is an informational website for gardening enthusiasts founded by Dave Whitinger. The website is owned by Internet Brands. Whitinger left the website in 2010 and is now the Executive Director of the National Gardening Association.

References

External links

Internet properties established in 2000
Internet forums
Works about gardening
Agricultural websites